Christian Nduwimana (born 18 May 1983 in Bujumbura) is a Burundian football midfielder. He currently plays for Belgium club K Wolvertem SC.

Trivia 
He played the first nationalteam game on 7 June 2008 in Ouagadougou Vs. Burkina Faso national football team.

References

External links
 
 
 
 K Wolvertem SC

1983 births
Living people
Burundian footballers
Burundian expatriate footballers
Burundi international footballers
Association football forwards
Sportspeople from Bujumbura
Burundian expatriate sportspeople in Belgium
21st-century Burundian people